Plastique is the second studio album by Sole and the Skyrider Band. It was released on Fake Four Inc. on October 13, 2009.

Critical reception

Rick Anderson of AllMusic gave the album 3 stars out of 5, writing, "This is not your typical hip-hop, that's for sure -- but most of it is well worth the effort required to absorb it." Andrew Dietzel of PopMatters gave the album 8 stars out of 10, stating that "The structures are distinctly hip hop, but they are also carefully constructed against the grain of repetitive sampling and crunked-out keyboards, a quality becoming increasingly rare, even amongst independent artists." Thomas Quinlan of Exclaim! commented that Sole's "dense, sarcastic, stream-of-consciousness poetry offers more than enough opportunity for those looking for a challenge."

Track listing

Personnel
Credits adapted from liner notes.

Sole and the Skyrider Band
 Tim Holland – vocals, lyrics
 Bud Berning – production
 William Ryan Fritch – instrumentation
 John Wagner – production, live drums

Additional musicians
 Markus Acher – vocals (2)

Technical personnel
 Doc Harrill – mixing, mastering

References

External links
 

2009 albums
Fake Four Inc. albums
Sole and the Skyrider Band albums